Edward Walton Wilcox is an American painter and sculptor. Originally from West Palm Beach, Florida, Wilcox earned a BFA in Painting with high honors from the University of Florida, where he also received the Presidential Award for Excellence in the Arts.

References

External links 
Coagula Art Journal, Issue #96, February, 2009

 Merry Karnowsky Gallery
 Edward Walton Wilcox

University of Florida alumni
Year of birth missing (living people)
Living people